Yuan Xikun (born 1944 in Kunming, Yunnan Province) is a Chinese visual artist and environmental activist. In 2011, Yuan proposed building a giant sculpture composed of sand collected from five of earth's continents and water from its Arctic and Antarctic regions to draw attention to ozone depletion and climate change.

Awards and decorations
 Top Philanthropist & Cultural Award (2006)
 UNEP Patron for the Arts Environment (2010)
 May Day Labor Honor Medal (2011)
 Order of Merit, 3rd class (Ukraine, 2008)

References

Living people
1944 births
Chinese contemporary artists
Chinese environmentalists
Recipients of the Order of Merit (Ukraine), 3rd class
Honorary Members of the Russian Academy of Arts
People from Kunming